Baena is an extinct genus of baenid turtles.

Fossils of Baena have been found in locations including Kirtland Formation, Campanian New Mexico (B. sp.) (Cretaceous) and Ravenscrag Formation, Maastrichtian Canada (B. sp.) (Cretaceous).

References 

Baenidae
Prehistoric turtle genera